Jeffrey Granville Bannister (born August 30, 1945) is a retired American decathlete. In 1979 he won the U.S. Olympic Trials and placed 21st at the 1972 Summer Olympics.

Bannister played basketball as a forward at University of New Hampshire. In 1966 he won the AAU pentathlon title; in the decathlon he finished third in 1969 and second in 1972.

References

American male decathletes
1945 births
Living people
Olympic track and field athletes of the United States
Athletes (track and field) at the 1972 Summer Olympics